Miss Moneypenny is a fictional character in the James Bond novels and films.

Moneypenny or Miss Moneypenny may also refer to:

 Miss Moneypenny's, a house music nightclub in Birmingham, England
 Andrew Moneypenny, a 17th century Irish Anglican churchman 
 Eric Moneypenny, an American comedian and writer
 "Mrs Moneypenny", pen-name of columnist Heather McGregor
 Moneypenny Creek, a tributary of the Susquehanna River in Wyoming County, Pennsylvania

See also
 
 Monypenny, a surname